John Meagher may refer to:

 John Meagher, Irish architect, partner in De Blacam & Meagher
 John Meagher (Canada East politician) (1805–1876), merchant and politician in Canada East
 John Paul Meagher (born 1939), developer and political figure in Saskatchewan, Canada
 John Meagher (Australian politician) (1837–1920), member of the New South Wales Legislative Council
 John F. Meagher (born 1948), Australian Thoroughbred racehorse trainer
 John W. Meagher (1917–1996), United States soldier, Medal of Honor recipient
 John Meagher (hurler) (born 1995), Irish hurler

See also
 Jack Meagher (1896–1968), American football coach
 Jack Meagher (Australian footballer) (born 1930), Australian rules football player